Chak Barbaria is a census town in the Barasat I CD block in the Barasat Sadar subdivision in the North 24 Parganas district in the Indian state of West Bengal. The town is close to Kolkata and also a part of Kolkata Urban Agglomeration.

Geography

Location

Chak Barbaria, Kokapur, Barbaria, Berunanpukuria and Jagannathpur form a loose cluster of villages and census towns along State Highway 2 (locally known as Barasat-Barrackpore Road), close to Barasat.

Duttapukur police station has jurisdiction over Barasat I CD Block.

Area overview
The area covered in the map alongside is largely a part of the north Bidyadhari Plain. located in the lower Ganges Delta. The country is flat. It is a little raised above flood level and the highest ground borders the river channels.54.67% of the people of the densely populated area lives in the urban areas and 45.33% lives in the rural  areas.

Note: The map alongside presents some of the notable locations in the subdivision. All places marked in the map are linked in the larger full screen map.

Demographics
 India census, Chak Barbaria had a population of 8,088; of this, 4,085 are male, 4,003female. It has an average literacy rate of 73.4%, lower than the national average of 74.04%.

Infrastructure
As per District Census Handbook 2011, Chak Barbaria covered an area of 0.5436 km2. It had 1 primary school, the nearest middle school, secondary school and senior secondary school were 2 km away at Barasat. Chak Barbaria had a hospital with 10 beds.

Transport
Local roads link Chak Barbaria to both National Highway 12 (old number NH 34) and State Highway 2 (locally known as Barasat-Barrackpore Road).

The nearest railway station is Barasat Junction railway station on the Sealdah-Bangaon line.

Healthcare
North 24 Parganas district has been identified as one of the areas where ground water is affected by arsenic contamination.

References

Cities and towns in North 24 Parganas district